Eilers may refer to:

Anton Eilers (1839–1917), German-born American entrepreneur
Arthur E. Eilers (1888–1958), former commissioner of the Missouri Valley Conference and coach at Washington University in St. Louis
Dave Eilers (born 1936), American former Major League Baseball pitcher
Emma Eilers (1870–1951), American painter
Henry A. Eilers (1870–1901), United States Navy sailor and Medal of Honor recipient
Justin Eilers (1978–2008), American mixed martial arts fighter
Justin Eilers (footballer) (born 1988), German footballer
Pat Eilers (born 1966), American former National Football League player
Sally Eilers (1908–1978), American actress
Surnames from given names